2008–09 Hong Kong Second Division League is the 95th season of a football league in Hong Kong, Hong Kong Second Division League.

Changes from last season

From Second Division
Promoted to First Division
 Mutual
Relegated to Third Division
 Lucky Mile
 New Fair Kuitan

To Second Division
Relegated from First Division
 Bulova Rangers (renamed as Rangers)
Promoted from Third Division League
 Shatin
 Wing Yee

Name changing
 Bulova Rangers renamed as Rangers
 EU Tai Chung renamed as Advance Tai Chung

League table

Results

Top scorers

Only players scored ≥8 is shown.

Notes

Hong Kong Second Division League seasons
Hong
2